Lenwood Ballard "Bill" Abbott, A.S.C. (June 13, 1908 – September 28, 1985) was an American special effects expert, cinematographer and cameraman.

He became the head of the Special Effects Department at 20th Century Fox in 1957, a post he held until retirement in 1970. He was called out of retirement, however, to work on the TV series M*A*S*H in 1972 (Abbott had worked on the film on which the series was based). Abbott was a member of the American Society of Cinematographers.

Awards and nominations
He was four times a winner or co-winner of an Academy Special Achievement Award for visual effects for Doctor Dolittle in 1968, Tora! Tora! Tora! in 1971 (shared with A. D. Flowers), The Poseidon Adventure in 1972 and Logan's Run in 1976.

Selected filmography
 The Day the Earth Stood Still (1951)
 The Enemy Below (1957)
 Voyage to the Bottom of the Sea (1961 film)
 Voyage to the Bottom of the Sea TV series (1964-1968)
 Lost in Space (TV Series 1965–1968)
 The Sound of Music (1965)
 The Time Tunnel TV series (1966-1967)
 Fantastic Voyage (1966)
 Planet of the Apes (1968)
 Butch Cassidy and the Sundance Kid (1969)
 Patton (1970)
 M*A*S*H (1972)
 The Poseidon Adventure (1972)
 The Towering Inferno (1974)
 Logan's Run (1976)
 The Swarm  (1978)
 When Time Ran Out (1980)

References

External links

See also
 Frank Van der Veer

1908 births
1985 deaths
Special effects people
American cinematographers
Special Achievement Academy Award winners